The women's 100 metres hurdles event at the 1999 Pan American Games was held on July 30.

Results
Wind: +1.2 m/s

References

Athletics at the 1999 Pan American Games
1999
1999 in women's athletics